Antaeotricha ithytona is a moth in the family Depressariidae. It was described by Edward Meyrick in 1929. It is found in Colombia.

References

Moths described in 1929
ithytona
Moths of South America
Taxa named by Edward Meyrick